Lingaraja Rest House/ Lingaraja Bisrama Ghara (14th Century A.D)

Approach
Lingaraja Rest House is situated on the western embankment of Bindu Sagar in
Gyananagara (Hadi sahi), Old Town Bhubaneswar. One can approach the temple on the left 
side of the road leadingfrom Kedara-Gouri Chowk to Vaital temple. It is a pidha deul and 
is facing towards the south. There is no presiding deity as it served as the Rest House of
lord Lingaraja, when the lord comes here to take rest in course of the Chandana Yatra, which
is held in the month of may every year.

Plan
i) Surrounding: The rest house is surrounded by western embankment of
Bindusagar tank in the east and residential buildings in other three sides.

ii) Orientation: The rest house is facing towards south.

Architectural features 
The temple stands on a high platform measuring 0.66 m in height. On plan, the temple
has a vimana, which is pancharatha. The vimana measures 4.25 m2. Panchanga bada
measures 2.23 m (pabhaga, talajangha, bandhana, upara jangha and baranda measures 0.60
m, 0.19 m, 0.48 m and 0.46 m respectively).
 
On elevation, the vimana is in pidha order and measures 6.23 m in height from pabhaga
to mastaka. Gandi has five receding tiers and measures 2.50 m in height. An udyota simha
is at the center of the gandi. Balustraded window in the eastern and western walls. The 
mastaka as usual has beki, ghanta, amlaka, khapuri and kalasa that measures 1.50 m in height.

Raha niche and parsvadevatas are not found in this temple. The doorjambs are plain.
Lintel is plain and building material is sandstone.

State of preservation

The northern wall has developed cracks and the rain water is seeping through the cracks.
It is maintained by Lingaraja Temple Administration.

Reference notes

Lesser Known Monuments of Bhubaneswar by Dr. Sadasiba Pradhan.
http://www.ignca.nic.in/

Buildings and structures in Odisha